The 2023 National Women's Soccer League season will be the eleventh season of the National Women's Soccer League, the top division of women's soccer in the United States. Including the NWSL's two professional predecessors, Women's Professional Soccer (2009–2011) and the Women's United Soccer Association (2001–2003), it will be the 17th overall season of FIFA and USSF-sanctioned top division women's soccer in the United States. Twelve teams will compete in the league.

The NWSL regular season, comprising 22 games for each team, will begin on March 25 and end on November 11, 2023. For the first time, the NWSL Challenge Cup will run entirely concurrent with the regular season from April to September 9, 2023.

Teams, stadiums, and personnel

Stadiums and locations 

Capacities listed here are full capacities, and do not reflect COVID-19 restrictions.

Personnel and sponsorship 
Note: All teams use Nike as their kit manufacturer as part of a league-wide sponsorship agreement renewed in November 2021.

Coaching changes

Regular season

Standings

Tiebreakers 
The initial determining factor for a team's position in the standings is most points earned, with three points earned for a win, one point for a draw, and zero points for a loss. If two or more teams tie in total points total when determining rank, playoff qualification, and seeding, the NWSL uses the following tiebreaker criteria, going down the list until all teams are ranked.

 Greater goal difference across the entire regular season (against all teams, not just tied teams).
 Most total wins across the entire regular season (against all teams, not just tied teams).
 Most goals scored across the entire regular season (against all teams, not just tied teams).
 Head-to-head results (total points) between the tied teams.
 Head-to-head most goals scored between the tied teams.
 Fewest disciplinary points accumulated across the entire regular season (against all teams, not just tied teams).
 Coin flip (if two teams are tied) or drawing of lots (if three or more teams are tied).

Results

Attendance

Average home attendances 
Ranked from highest to lowest average attendance.

Highest attendances

Statistical leaders

Top scorers

Top assists

Clean sheets

Hat-tricks

Playoffs 

The top six teams from the regular season will qualify for the NWSL Championship playoffs, with the top two teams receiving a first-round bye.

Challenge Cup

Individual awards

Annual awards

Teams of the Year 
Best XI

Second XI

Monthly Awards

Player of the Month

Rookie of the Month

Team of the Month

Weekly awards

References

External links 

 
2023
National Women's Soccer League
National Women's Soccer League season